The Transit Agreement (German: Transitabkommen), signed 17 December 1971, arranged access to and from West Berlin from West Germany, secured the right of West Berliners to visit East Berlin and East Germany, and secured the rights of East German citizens to visit West Germany, although only in cases of family emergency.

See also
 Four Power Agreement on Berlin
 Basic Treaty

References

History of East Germany
Treaties of East Germany
1972 in East Germany
1972 in West Germany
Treaties of West Germany
Cold War history of Germany
East Germany–West Germany relations
1970s in West Berlin
Treaties concluded in 1971
Treaties extended to West Berlin
Treaties entered into force in 1972